Killing Me Inside is an Indonesian post hardcore band from South Jakarta. The band's current line up consists of Josaphat Klements, Gama Gifari, Machdis Arie & Faizal Permana. The band has changed formation over the years many times due to members frequently leaving.

Career

Killing Me Inside was formed in June 2005 by Josaphat Klements (guitar), Onadio Leonardo (bass), Rendy (drums) and Raka Cyril Damar (guitar). After a search for a vocalist, the band found Fauzan "Sansan", who joined in December 2005. While performing at local cafes & events, they released a three-song demo. The songs included were "A Letter Of Memories", "Suicide Phenomena", & "The Tormented". These were later re-recorded for their debut album.

Before they released the debut album, the band announced on My Space that Raka had left the band due to a conflict of interest with other bands Vierra (now Vierratale) in May 2008.

Their debut album, A Fresh Start for Something New, was officially released on January 2, 2009 through Fast Youth Records.

Not long after the release of the debut album, Sansan left the group to focus on his other band Pee Wee Gaskins. Rendy also left around this time to consider his future. In February 2009, the band announced their new formation, which consisted of Onadio (vocal), Josaphat (guitar), Davi Frisya (drum) & Agung Wahyu Dewantoro (bass).

The band later featured Sansan as keyboardist & new member Rudye Nugraha Putra on bass. Agung Wahyu Dewantoro ultimately left the band due to incompatibility with the other members.

2010-2012: Self titled album & 1 Reason

Killing Me Inside signed to Crooz Records & released their 2nd album Killing Me Inside. The album had several songs which were re-recorded from their debut album. It sold over 500,000 albums & was certified platinum by Royal Prima Musikindo. "Biarlah" was released as the 1st single, & received a positive response from listeners. Due to this success, Killing Me Inside earned awards for Best Indie Music & Best New Artist. They also received 2 nominations, for Best of the Best New comeback & Best Rock Album at the 14th Annual Anugerah Musik Indonesia.

In September 2011, Davi announced he was departing from the band via Twitter. After that, Killing Me Inside announced that Rudye was now officially a member of the band. Putra Pra Ramadhan also joined Killing Me Inside, replacing Davi as additional drummer.

Killing Me Inside's third studio album, 1 Reason, was released in September 2012, & produced the singles "Menyesal", "Never Go Back" and "For 1 Last Time". Prior to the release of 1 Reason, the band had also issued the single "Melangkah".

2014-present: Rebirth: A New Beginning,  new concept & departure of Onad

In 2014, vocalist Onadio decided to leave the band due to differences in direction & frequent issues with his throat. He also later admitted that he was already bored with this genre of music. In an interview, Onadio revealed that he had had conflicting issues with Josaphat.

Killing Me Inside created a new concept album comprising genres such as metalcore and electronic dance music (EDM). 2007 Mamamia finalist Savira Razak replaced Onadio as vocalist. The band released their fourth studio album, Rebirth: A New Beginning. At the 18th Annual Anugerah Musik Indonesia, Killing Me Inside was nominated for Best Rock Album.

In 2016, drummer Putra Pra Ramadhan announced on his Instagram account that he was leaving the band to focus on teaching drumming.

Members

Current
 Josaphat Klements – guitar (2005–present)
 Gama Gifari – drums, percussion instrument (2016–present)
 Machdis Arie – bass (2017–present)
 Faizal Permana – vocals (2019-present)

Former
 Raka Cyril Damar – guitar, backing vocals (2005–2008)
 Davi Frisya – drums, percussion instrument (2009–2011)
 Onadio Leonardo – bass and backing vocal (2005–2009), vocals (2009–2014)
 Savira Razak – vocals (2014–2018)
 Putra Pra Ramadhan – drums, percussion instrument (2011–2016)
 Erlangga Wibisana – bass (2010–2018)
 Rudye Nugraha Putra – keyboardist, programming, loop, backing vocals, streaming vocals (2009–2019)

Discography

Studio albums
 A Fresh Start for Something New (2009)
 Killing Me Inside (2010)
 1 Reason (2013)
 Rebirth: A New Beginning (2015)

References

External links
 Official sites

Musical groups established in 2005
Indonesian rock music groups
Anugerah Musik Indonesia winners